Reishia clavigera is a species of sea snail, a marine gastropod mollusk in the family Muricidae, the murex snails or rock snails.

This species has been found to be useful as an indicator of the environmental contamination levels of arsenic, copper, and zinc.

Distribution
This is an intertidal species, found on rocky shores in Malaysia, Singapore and Indo-China; also off Japan.

Description

References

 Claremont M., Vermeij G.J., Williams S.T. & Reid D.G. (2013) Global phylogeny and new classification of the Rapaninae (Gastropoda: Muricidae), dominant molluscan predators on tropical rocky seashores. Molecular Phylogenetics and Evolution 66: 91–102.

External links
 Küster, H. C. (1843-1860). Die Gattungen Buccinum, Purpura, Concholepas und Monoceros. In: Küster, H. C., Ed. Systematisches Conchylien-Cabinet von Martini und Chemnitz. Neu herausgegeben und vervollständigt. Dritten Bandes erste Abtheilung. 3(1): 1-229, pls 1-35. Nürnberg: Bauer & Raspe.
 Guo X., Zhao D., Jung D., Li Q., Kong L.-F., Ni G., et al. (2015). "Phylogeography of the Rock Shell Thais clavigera (Mollusca): Evidence for Long-Distance Dispersal in the Northwestern Pacific". PLOS One 10(7): e0129715. 
 Zhao, D., Kong, L.-F., Sasaki, T. & Li, Q. (2020). Molecular species delimitation of the genus Reishia (Mollusca: Gastropoda) along the coasts of China and Korea. Zoological Science. 37(4): 382-390
 Contamination study 
 Contamination study 

clavigera
Gastropods described in 1860
Animal dyes
Marine gastropods